Tsanko Lavrenov was a Bulgarian painter and art critic born in 1896, deceased in 1978.

He is one of the most prominent, influential and distinctive Bulgarian artists of the 20th century. A modernist influenced by the Symbolism and the Secession, Lavrenov is best known for his cityscapes of the old town of Plovdiv as well as his monasteries cycle.

Biography and career
Tsanko Ivanov Lavrenov was born on November 24, 1896 in the city of Plovdiv, Bulgaria. His grandfather Lavrentiy was a bookman, copyist of catholic manuscripts. Lavrenov graduated at the French college in Plovdiv. In 1921-22, he enrolled at a private art school in Vienna.

Selected works

 The Old Plovdiv (1930)
 Transfiguration Monastery
 Kurshum han (1937)
 The Church of St Sophia in Ohrid (1942)
 Saint Pantaleon Church in Veles, Macedonia (1943)
 Still life with flowers of the field (1944)
 The Old Plovdiv - diptych (1946)
 The Old Plovdiv (1974–75)

Holy Mountain cycle
 Zograf Monastery (1936)
 The main gate of Vatopedi monastery (1941)
 General view of Helandariou monastery (1942)
 The port of Zograf Monastery (1958)

References

External links 
 Tsanko Lavrenov at pravoslavieto.com
 Tsanko Lavrenov at bezramka.bg
 Tsanko Lavrenov at Loran gallery

Cityscape artists
1896 births
1978 deaths
Artists from Plovdiv
20th-century Bulgarian painters
20th-century male artists
Male painters